OACIS for the Middle East is a union list of serials from or about the Middle East.

Members
 American University of Beirut
 Bibliotheca Alexandrina
 Cornell University
 Harvard University
 New York Public Library
 New York University
 Ohio State University
 Princeton University
 School of Oriental and African Studies, University of London, UK
 Stanford University
 Tishreen University, Latakia, Syria
 Universitäts- und Landesbibliothek Sachsen-Anhalt, Halle, Germany
 University of Arizona
 University of Balamand, Al-Kurah, Lebanon
 University of California—Los Angeles
 University of Illinois at Urbana-Champaign
 University of Jordan, Amman, Jordan
 University of Pennsylvania
 University of Michigan
 University of Texas
 University of Utah
 University of Washington
 Yale Law School
 Yale University

References
 http://library.yale.edu/oacis/

Yale University Library